Thomas J. "Long Tom" Doran (December 2, 1880 – June 22, 1910) was a backup catcher in Major League Baseball who played from 1904 through 1906 for the Boston Americans (1904-1905[start], 1906) and Detroit Tigers (1905[end]). He was born in Westchester County, New York.

In a three-season career, Doran was a .144 hitter (19-for-132) with 10 runs, four RBI, three doubles, one triple, and three stolen bases without home runs in 51 games played.
 
Doran died in New York, New York, at the age of 29.

See also

Boston Red Sox all-time roster
Detroit Tigers all-time roster

Sources
Baseball Reference
Encyclopedia of Baseball Catchers

Boston Americans players
Detroit Tigers players
Major League Baseball catchers
Baseball players from New York (state)
1880 births
1910 deaths
New Haven Blues players
Concord Marines players
Colorado Springs Millionaires players
Montreal Royals players
Rochester Bronchos players
Toronto Maple Leafs (International League) players
Williamsport Millionaires players
People from Westchester County, New York
Burials at Saint Raymond's Cemetery (Bronx)